Jan Šindelář (born 3 November 1993) is a Czech bobsledder. He competed at the 2018 and 2022 Winter Olympics.

References

External links
 

1993 births
Living people
Czech male bobsledders
Olympic bobsledders of the Czech Republic
Bobsledders at the 2018 Winter Olympics
Bobsledders at the 2022 Winter Olympics
Place of birth missing (living people)
People from Nymburk
Sportspeople from the Central Bohemian Region